Vetvenik is the second largest village of Yushkinskaya Volost which is a part of Gdovsky District of Pskov Oblast, Russia, located on the shore of Lake Peipus.

The population in 2002 was 89 people. Vetvenik is home to a primary school and a large church.

References

Rural localities in Pskov Oblast